Elephantopoides is an ichnogenus of footprint created by sauropods, and known from Jurassic strata.

See also

 List of dinosaur ichnogenera

References

Dinosaur trace fossils
Sauropods